Alden Coy Coder (December 7, 1909 – June 7, 1985) was the head football coach for the Montclair State University Red Hawks in Upper Montclair, New Jersey from 1946 to 1952 and then again from 1954 to 1956. He compiled an overall record of 29–32–4. He died in June 1985 after years of declining health.

Head coaching record

Football

References

1909 births
1985 deaths
Basketball coaches from Pennsylvania
Montclair State Red Hawks football coaches
Montclair State Red Hawks men's basketball coaches
People from Huntingdon County, Pennsylvania